Sébastien Foucras (born 4 January 1971) is a French freestyle skier and Olympic medalist. He received a silver medal at the 1998 Winter Olympics in Nagano, in aerials.
He participated in Fort Boyard game show in 1996 helping Adeline Blondieau team win 76660 French francs.

References

1971 births
Living people
French male freestyle skiers
Freestyle skiers at the 1998 Winter Olympics
Olympic silver medalists for France
Olympic medalists in freestyle skiing
Medalists at the 1998 Winter Olympics